The Slovakia men's national basketball team represents Slovakia in international basketball competition. The supervising body is the Slovak Basketball Association (SBA).

Slovakia is one of the newest national basketball teams in the world, having split from Czechoslovakia following the dissolution of the unified state in 1993. They joined FIBA later that year, and played in their first international match against Bosnia and Herzegovina. Slovakia to date does not have much history on the international level. Although they have attempted to qualify for major tournaments such as EuroBasket and the FIBA World Cup, but have yet to reach qualification.

History

The Czechoslovak era
Until 1993, Slovakia was a part of Czechoslovakia, with Slovak born players taking part on the Czechoslovakia national team. One of the most notable players who was born in Slovakia, and played for the Czechoslovakia national team to achieve success at the international level was Stanislav Kropilák. He helped lead Czechoslovakia to three medal finishes at the EuroBasket, in 1977, 1981, and 1985.

After independence
After gaining independence from Czechoslovakia, the Slovak national team on numerous attempts during their early years strived to qualify for EuroBasket, but ultimately came up short. In qualification to reach EuroBasket 2017, Slovakia was slotted into Group F to begin the qualifiers. Slovakia, however, would go on to struggle to a (1–5) record and missing their chance to qualify.

For qualification to the 2019 FIBA World Cup, Slovakia took part in European Pre-Qualifiers, but were eventually eliminated after amassing a (1–5) record in their group. Slovakia later went through EuroBasket 2022 Pre-Qualifiers but were once again denied of making it to the continental stage, after finishing with a (3–5) record during pre-qualifying.

Competitive record

FIBA World Cup

Olympic Games

EuroBasket

Team

Current roster
Roster for the EuroBasket 2025 Pre-Qualifiers matches on 23 and 26 February 2023 against North Macedonia and Denmark.

Depth chart

Head coach position
 Milan Cernicky – (2004–2010)
 Peter Balint – (2011–2012)
 Miroslav Grznár – (2012–2013)
 Milan Cernicky – (2014–2015)
 Ivan Rudež – (2016–2018)
 Žan Tabak – (2019–2021)
 Oleg Meleshchenko – (2021–2022)
 Aramis Naglić – (2022–present)

Results and schedule

2021

2022

2023

See also

Sport in Slovakia
Slovakia women's national basketball team
Slovakia men's national under-20 basketball team
Slovakia men's national under-18 basketball team
Slovakia men's national under-16 basketball team

Notes

References

External links
Official website 
Slovakia FIBA profile
Slovakia National Team – Men at Eurobasket.com
Slovakia Basketball Records at FIBA Archive

Slovakia national basketball team
Basketball teams in Slovakia
Men's national basketball teams